Hypostomus seminudus is a species of catfish in the family Loricariidae. It is native to South America, where it is known only from Brazil. The species is believed to be a facultative air-breather.

References 

seminudus
Freshwater fish of Brazil
Fish described in 1888